Greece Olympia High School is a high school located in Rochester, New York, United States. It is a member of Project Lead the Way.

Notable alumni
 Members of the indie band Joywave
 Marcus Wilson - football player; former Green Bay Packer running back

See also
Greece Athena High School
Greece Arcadia High School
Odyssey Academy

References

External links

Public high schools in New York (state)
Educational institutions established in 1959
High schools in Monroe County, New York
1959 establishments in New York (state)